"Can't Get Better Than This" is the debut single by Australian dance and electronic music duo Parachute Youth. It was written by Sam Littlemore, Mathew Gill and John Courtidis.

The song was released on 28 January 2012 in Australia, and charted in Belgium and Luxembourg in 2012.

Music video
A music video to accompany the release of "Can't Get Better Than This" was first released on YouTube on 21 December 2011.  It was filmed in the landlocked West African nation of Burkina Faso.  The film clip samples scenes from an annual motorbike race in Ouagadougou, including images of riders passing the national monument "Monument des Héros Nationaux".

The video has a length of three minutes and forty seconds.

Track listing

Chart performance

Release history

Certifications

References

External links
 Official website
 Parachute Youth on Facebook
 Parachute Youth on Twitter

2012 singles
Parachute Youth songs
2011 songs
Songs written by Sam Littlemore